The Trigger Twins are the names of two sets of fictional Western themed comic book characters published by DC Comics.

Fictional character biography

Walter and Wayne Trigger

The Trigger Twins first appear in All-Star Western #58 (May 1951), the first issue of that title under its new name (previously known as All Star Comics), and was one of the features that replaced the previous stars, the Justice Society of America.  The series was created by Robert Kanigher and Carmine Infantino.

The series feature the adventures of a pair of twin brothers, Walt and Wayne Trigger. Walt is a sheriff, while Wayne is a civilian; however, Wayne is more accurate and faster on the draw with firearms than his brother, a secret known only by the pair themselves. The series' running theme has Wayne impersonating Walt on various adventures as needed, through secretly wearing identical clothes and using a twin of Walt's horse, so that no one suspects that Wayne was covering for Walt.

The series ran through All Star Western #116 (1961) after which they were replaced by another feature, and were unseen until Showcase #72 (February 1968) when a story was reprinted under the banner, "Top Gun", a oneshot filler issue. In 1973 they were given a short-lived title. The Twins appeared in All-Star Squadron during the Crisis on Infinite Earths, at which point it is revealed they reside on Earth-Two. Their origin was told in Secret Origins (vol. 2) #48 in April 1990.

They were seen in Weird Western Tales #71.

Tom and Tad Trigger

A modern pair of Trigger Twins are introduced in Detective Comics #667 (October 1993). They are Tom and Tad Trigger, a pair of criminals who resemble their Old West counterparts, although it is unknown if they are actually related. They first meet when they both decide, separately, to rob the same bank at the same time. Though shocked and confused at seeing how they look alike (in a move which exposes their faces to the bank customers), they decide to work together in finishing the robbery and escaping.

They later try to make more money by robbing a local mafia numbers runner; despite two of his men being killed by the duo, the boss of the organization talks the twins into working for him. They soon set to work killing the man's adversaries.

Later, the two encounter the Azrael Batman during a heist of a Gotham Subway train.

A blonde, female criminal rescues them from a chain gang. She fools them into believing she is their long lost sister; this is a ruse to ensure their help in her plans. Robin and many other heroes, including modern day versions of Pow Wow Smith and Nighthawk, help take them down. Much of the action takes place in a recreation of a classic wild west town/Gotham City tourist attraction.

Around this time, they are hired by the super-powered villain Roland Desmond, operating out of the city of Blüdhaven.

As with many other villains during the Infinite Crisis storyline, the twins join up with the Secret Society of Super Villains. As part of an army, they are sent to destroy the city of Metropolis. Another army of superheroes face them. During what is called Battle of Metropolis, the twins are shot down in the street by a group of vigilantes that include the current Vigilante and Wild Dog who were perched on a nearby rooftop.

Blackest Night
During the Blackest Night crossover, the Trigger Twins are among the many deceased villains that receive a black power ring, reanimating them into Black Lanterns.

Other versions
The Earth 18 version of Trigger Twins appears in The Multiversity Guidebook #1. The Trigger Twins are Justice Riders' members.

In other media
In the Arrowverse's "Elseworlds" crossover, John Deegan rewrites reality, turning Barry Allen and Oliver Queen into the Trigger Twins before they eventually defeat Deegan and restore reality.

References

External links
 Toonopedia article on the Trigger Twins

Characters created by Carmine Infantino
Characters created by Chuck Dixon
Characters created by Graham Nolan
Characters created by Robert Kanigher
Comics characters introduced in 1951
Comics characters introduced in 1993
DC Comics superhero teams
DC Comics supervillain teams
DC Comics male superheroes
DC Comics male supervillains
DC Comics Western (genre) characters
Superhero duos
Twin characters in comics
Western (genre) gunfighters
Western (genre) peace officers